InDevR is a biotechnology company in Boulder, Colorado, that develops advanced life science instrumentation and assays for analysis of viruses and other microorganisms, as well as protein detection and characterization, with product focus on Virus Quantification and pathogen detection/identification.

History
The company was founded in 2003 by Kathy L. Rowlen, Laura R. Kuck, and John W. Birks as an LLC.  The origin of the name derived from its early stage goals of Instrument Development and Research.  The company converted to a corporation in 2005 with a shift toward product sales and customer support.

In 2005, InDevR purchased majority ownership of 2B Technologies, a leader in the field of analytical instruments for atmospheric and environmental measurements.  An ISO 9001:2000-certified manufacturer, 2B Technologies has produced and sold over 2,000 ozone monitors and related instruments.

InDevR is a recipient of the government-sponsored Small Business Innovation Research program.  The company received a Phase I grant in 2006 to develop a revolutionary instrument for Virus Quantification from the National Institute of Allergy and Infectious Diseases (NIAID), part of the National Institutes of Health.  Based on demonstration of feasibility in Phase I, InDevR received a Phase II grant in 2008.  Both of these grants led directly to the creation of several high-tech jobs that continue to date as InDevR translated the funding for research and development into the commercially available Virus Counter product line.

In 2012, InDevR spun off the Virus Counter Instrument to ViroCyt, LCC. The focus of InDevR's efforts will now be on the development and commercialization of their low-density microarray technology, which can be used to improve the analysis of viruses and other microorganisms as well as detecting and characterizing proteins.

Products

ampliPHOX
ampliPHOX Colorimetric Detection Technology was created as a research tool for the analysis of low-density microarrays by providing rapid, cost effective colorimetric detection with minimal user input. Rather than a fluorescent label traditionally used in microarray applications, ampliPHOX Colorimetric Detection Technology utilizes a photo initiator that, when activated by light, generates signal amplification through polymerization of an organic monomer. The detection technology is easy to use and can be completed within minutes when applied to low-density microarrays. The ampliPHOX Reader is used to activate photopolymerization on low-density microarrays, to image the resulting pattern of visual spots, and automatically interpret the image – providing the user with immediate results.

In addition to the ampliPHOX Colorimetric Detection Technology, InDevR also supplies Custom Low Density Microarrays specifically designed to work with the ampliPHOX platform.  The Custom Microarrays can include up to 850 unique probes per array.  Research at the USDA has utilized ampliPHOX to profile Shiga toxin-producing Escherichia coli by identifying the O-antigen gene clusters and virulence genes.

FluChip
The FluChip was invented by a joint team of scientists at the University of Colorado at Boulder and the Centers for Disease Control and Prevention (Atlanta) in an NIAID-supported effort led by then-Professor Kathy Rowlen.  InDevR licensed the intellectual property from the University of Colorado and CDC in 2009.  Identification of influenza viruses using the FluChip is one application InDevR is targeting in their development of a fully automated molecular diagnostics platform.

VaxArray
VaxArray is a multiplexed immunoassay for quantifying influenza hemagglutinin (HA) protein.  The assay is based on a “universal” panel of subtype‐specific monoclonal antibodies printed in an array format.  This technology enables vaccine researchers and manufacturers to track HA concentration from crude extracts through finished product.

Vidia
The Vidia™ Microarray Imaging System from InDevR delivers quantitative fluorescence results for multiplexed microarray assays.

See also
 Virus Counter
 FluChip
 ampliPHOX

References

External links
InDevR Website
InDevR LinkedIn Company Profile
2B Technologies Website

Biotechnology companies of the United States